In mathematics, the Brauer–Suzuki theorem, proved by , , , states that if a finite group has a generalized quaternion Sylow 2-subgroup and no non-trivial normal subgroups of odd order, then the group has a center of order 2. In particular, such a group cannot be simple.

A generalization of the Brauer–Suzuki theorem is given by Glauberman's Z* theorem.

References

 gives a detailed proof of the Brauer–Suzuki theorem.

Theorems about finite groups